Mialet is a commune in the Gard department in southern France.

It lies close to Alès and Saint-Jean-du-Gard.

The commune includes the hamlet of Mas Soubeyran, centre of the Protestant resistance during the 16th century.

History 
The town's entire population was expelled by French troops on 1 April 1703, during the War of the Camisards.

Population

Sights
 Bridge, the Pont des camisards
 Mas Soubeyran, known for its annual Protestant gatherings

Notable residents
Rolland, or Rolland Laporte, from his real name Pierre Laporte, born 3 January 1680, died 14 April 1704, was a Camisard chief in the Cévennes, nicknamed «le Général des enfants de Dieu» (general of the children of God). His birth house is now the Musée du Désert.

See also
Communes of the Gard department

References

External links

 Le Musée du Désert website 

Communes of Gard